The 1934 Ohio State Buckeyes football team represented Ohio State University in the 1934 college football season. The Buckeyes compiled a 7–1 record. In Francis Schmidt's first season, the Buckeyes outscored their opponents 267–34.

Schedule

Coaching staff
 Francis Schmidt, head coach, first year

References

Ohio State
Ohio State Buckeyes football seasons
Ohio State Buckeyes football